Lists of Egyptian hieroglyphs cover Egyptian hieroglyphs. They include:

 Gardiner's sign list, a list of common Egyptian hieroglyphs compiled by Sir Alan Gardiner and published in 1928–1929.
 List of Egyptian hieroglyphs, an updated list that extends Gardiner's lists
 Egyptian Hieroglyphs (Unicode block), the official computer encoding of the hieroglyphs
 Egyptian biliteral signs, hieroglyphs which represent a specific sequence of two consonants
 Egyptian triliteral signs, hieroglyphs which represent a specific sequence of three consonants